The 1972–73 Serie A season was won by Juventus.

Teams
Ternana, Lazio and Palermo had been promoted from Serie B while Mantova, Catanzaro and Varese was relegated to Serie B. That was the last season for Mantova in Serie A.

Final classification

Results

Top goalscorers

References and sources
Almanacco Illustrato del Calcio - La Storia 1898-2004, Panini Edizioni, Modena, September 2005

External links
  - All results on RSSSF Website.

1972-73
Italy
1